Bronwyn Olivia Eyre is a Canadian politician, who was elected to the Legislative Assembly of Saskatchewan in the 2016 provincial election. She represents the electoral district of Saskatoon Stonebridge-Dakota as a member of the Saskatchewan Party. As of February 2, 2018, she is currently serving as the Minister of Energy and Resources, as well as Minister Responsible for SaskEnergy and SaskWater.

Cabinet positions

References

Living people
Women government ministers of Canada
Members of the Executive Council of Saskatchewan
Saskatchewan Party MLAs
Women MLAs in Saskatchewan
Politicians from Saskatoon
21st-century Canadian politicians
21st-century Canadian women politicians
Saskatchewan school board members
Canadian people of Irish descent
University of Saskatchewan alumni
Canadian people of French descent
Canadian radio personalities
1971 births
Canadian people of Czech descent